The cycling at the 1987 Southeast Asian Games result, from 10 September until 19 September 1987.

Medal summary

Men

Women

Medal table

References
 https://eresources.nlb.gov.sg/newspapers/Digitised/Article/straitstimes19870911-1.2.56.38
 http://eresources.nlb.gov.sg/newspapers/Digitised/Article/straitstimes19870913-1.2.43.4
 http://eresources.nlb.gov.sg/newspapers/Digitised/Article/straitstimes19870916-1.2.46.13.12
 http://eresources.nlb.gov.sg/newspapers/Digitised/Article/straitstimes19870917-1.2.57.22.4
 http://eresources.nlb.gov.sg/newspapers/Digitised/Article/straitstimes19870919-1.2.56.21

1987 Southeast Asian Games
Southeast Asian Games
1987
1987 in track cycling